Aert is a Dutch short form of the given name Arnout (English Arnold).  Notable people with the name include:
 Aert Anthoniszoon (1580–1620), Dutch marine painter
 Aert van den Bossche (15th century), Flemish renaissance painter
 Aert de Gelder (1645–1727), Dutch painter
 Aert van der Goes (1475–1545), Dutch lawyer
 Aert H. Kuipers (1919–2012), Dutch linguist
 Aert Jansz Marienhof (1626–1652), Dutch Golden Age painter
 Aert Mijtens (c.1541–1602), Flemish Renaissance painter
 Aert van der Neer (1603–1677), Dutch landscape painter 
 Aert Jansse van Nes (1626–1693), Dutch naval commander
 Aert Pietersz (1550–1612), Dutch Golden Age painter
 Aert Schouman (1710–1792),  Dutch painter
 Aert van Tricht (15th century–1550s), Dutch metal-caster
 Aert van Waes (1620–1675), Dutch Golden Age painter

See also 
Aart
Art (given name)
 Van Aert

References

Dutch masculine given names